Kimberley Renicks (11 February 1988, Bellshill) is a Scottish Judoka, who won gold at the 2014 Commonwealth Games.

Judo career
She won the Commonwealth Games gold medal in the Women's 48 kg Judo event at the 2014 Commonwealth Games in Glasgow. Her older sister Louise is also a judoka who won a gold medal at the same Games.

On 22 February 2018, it was announced that National Tyres and Autocare were to become a sponsor of Renicks.

Renicks is a four times champion of Great Britain, winning the extra-lightweight division at the British Judo Championships in 2015, 2017, 2018 and 2019.In 2022, she competed in her second Commonwealth Games in Birmingham.

References

External links
 Louise & Kimberly Renicks at North Lanarkshire Sporting Hall Of Fame

Living people
1988 births
Sportspeople from Coatbridge
Scottish female judoka
Judoka at the 2014 Commonwealth Games
Commonwealth Games medallists in judo
Commonwealth Games gold medallists for Scotland
Medallists at the 2014 Commonwealth Games